"'Ingenting" (Swedish for Nothing) is a song by Swedish alternative rock band Kent from their seventh studio album, Tillbaka till samtiden. It was released as the album's lead single on 17 September 2007 through RCA Records and Sony BMG.

Track listing

Charts

Weekly charts

Year-end charts

Chart positions

Kent (band) songs
2007 singles
Song recordings produced by Joshua (record producer)
2007 songs
RCA Records singles
Sony BMG singles
Songs written by Joakim Berg